Jun S. Liu (born 1965) is a Chinese-American statistician focusing on Bayesian statistical inference and computational biology. He received the COPSS Presidents' Award in 2002. Liu is a professor in the Department of Statistics at Harvard University and has written many research papers and a book about Markov chain Monte Carlo algorithms, including their applications in biology. He is also co-author of the Tmod software for sequence motif discovery.

Education
Liu received his B.Sc. from Peking University in 1985. He was a PhD candidate of mathematics at Rutgers University from 1986 to 1988, and obtained his Ph.D. in statistics under the supervision of Wing Hung Wong from the University of Chicago in 1991.

Career and research
Liu was an Institute of Mathematical Statistics (IMS) Medallion Lecturer in 2002 and a Bernoulli Lecturer in 2004. He was elected a fellow of the Institute of Mathematical Statistics in 2004 and of the American Statistical Association in 2005.

References

1965 births
Living people
American statisticians
Bayesian statisticians
Fellows of the Institute of Mathematical Statistics
Fellows of the American Statistical Association
Harvard University faculty
Peking University alumni
Rutgers University alumni
University of Chicago alumni
People's Republic of China emigrants to the United States